Chipping is a hamlet in the civil parish of Buckland in the East Hertfordshire district, in the county of Hertfordshire, England. Situated along the A10 road (which follows the course of the Roman Ermine Street), Chipping was an early, but unsuccessful attempt to create a market town at the crossing of the River Rib by Ermine Street. 
Chipping is situated half a mile west of the prime meridian. Prior to 1750, Chipping was referred to as New Chipping, today this name is rarely used.

History

Early history 
The current settlement of Chipping first emerged along the former Roman Road Ermine Street as the manor of Pope's Hall (now Chipping Hall) then a part of Buckland village, as mentioned in the Doomsday Book. Former earthworks, including a moat (all destroyed in the 1950s) inside Burhill Wood to the west of Chipping, could suggest an earlier Iron Age settlement or hill fort, predating the present-day Chipping.   

Chipping as an independent settlement to Buckland developed around 1220 as New Cheping (later becoming New Chipping), due to its strategic location along Ermine Street as a final stop-off for passing traffic before confronting several steep hills whilst travelling between London and York, and later, London and Cambridge.

Chipping was the site of a market (every Friday) and fair (three days a year) from 1252 until 1360 before its transferral to nearby Buntingford by Elizabeth de Burgh, 4th Countess of Ulster the lord of the manor of Pope's Hall due to its dwindling trade caused by Buntingford's rapid growth compared to Chipping.

The English Civil War

In April 1643, during the second year of the English Civil War, a skirmish occurred in Chipping, which was situated along the worst section of Ermine Street. A group of Parliamentarians were sent by Oliver Cromwell to collect treasures from Cambridge, including a new helmet ordered by Cromwell as he found his old helmet “ill-set”. When passing through Chipping they were “set upon by a Royalist party with so much vigour, and evidently superior numbers that while the fight was proceeding some of the attacking party carried on with most of the baggage”. After much fighting, the Parliamentarians were able to beat off the Royalist assault and escape with Cromwell’s helmet.
One Parliamentarian at the skirmish later said, “We went up with the treasure; got sadly mauled coming back by ruffians at Chipping, but lost near all our luggage”. On the delivery of his new helmet, Cromwell commended the victories’ party. With the Chipping helmet becoming the first of Cromwell’s recognisable helmets that he wore throughout the remaining civil war.

After 1700 

From 1700 until the mid-nineteenth century the main occupation of Chipping's residence was farming, working the dense woodland and farmland surrounding the village, whilst other villages served passing trade along Ermine Street. However, Chipping has always been overshadowed by its larger neighbours of Buntingford to the south and Royston to the north, with its population remaining small, it was never large enough for the construction of a church.

Sometime after its closure in 1360 the market was re-established, before it was finally closed in 1883. Until the late nineteenth-century Chipping was divided between the parish of Therfield, to the west side of Ermine Street and Buckland parish, to the east.

A Post mill was formerly situated on Mill Hill to the east of the village from around 1737 until 1838. The former public house, The Royal Oak, was destroyed by fire sometime in the 1970s, its site now hosts the Cul-de-sac Royal Oak Close.

Today

Population
The population of Chipping in 1851 was 215, however, with the development of the railway, causing decreased road traffic and growing demand for industrial workers in cities, meant Chipping's population fell to below 100 by 1905.  
Today Chipping has around 50 houses with a population of around 125 to 150 as of 2011. The parish of Buckland and Chipping has a combined population of 274 as of 2011, with the population roughly split between both villages.

Local government
Along with its neighbour Buckland, Chipping elects members to the Buckland and Chipping parish council. 
Chipping is in the Buntingford ward of the Hertfordshire County Council unitary authority, which is responsible for all significant local government functions. Additionally, Chipping is within the Buntingford ward of East Hertfordshire District Council, having two district councillors.
On the national level, Chipping is in the North East Hertfordshire parliamentary constituency.

Landmarks
Chipping has an array of historic and modern landmarks, with over half of Chipping's current housing being built since the turn of the twentieth century. Chipping also includes several historic buildings, thatched cottages and a public house, many of which date back to the 17th century and earlier. 

The Countryman (Inn) (formerly The Red Lion Inn until 1975) is a 17th-century coaching inn, built in 1663, it has operated as a public house since 1760. Situated in the centre of the village, The Countryman has hosted the yearly 'World Sausage Tossing Championship' every August since 2014.

Chipping also includes the manor house of Chipping Hall (formerly Pope's Hall), with the current hall dating from the early eighteenth-century, the main hall, dovecot and walled gardens are constructed in early Georgian architecture from red brick. The manor of Pope's Hall was inherited by Lionel of Antwerp, 1st Duke of Clarence from his wife Elizabeth de Burgh, 4th Countess of Ulster after her death in 1363. On the north side of Chipping Hall is a large eighteenth-century farmyard, once apart of Chipping Hall farm, it was sold and converted into housing around 2007.

Chipping also includes a former Congregational Chapel which was constructed in 1844 and a former Mission Room constructed in 1878 for a cost of £380, both are now in private ownership. Six houses along Chipping's Brookside lane were some of the UK's first council housing constructed under the Addison Act of 1919.

Toponym
The name Chipping likely derives from ceapen, an Old English word meaning 'market', referring to the market hosted in Chipping between 1252 and 1360, though it is also possible the name rather derives from the Medieval English word chepynge meaning 'long market square', supported by early references to Chipping as New Cheping. Chipping is a prefix name used by several places in England, however, only Chipping, Lancashire shares the sole use of the name Chipping.

Chipping's historic name New Chipping used prior to 1750 (less commonly used until 1900) more specifically meaning 'new market'. The reason why new was dropped from Chipping's name is unknown, though this change was likely gradual, evolving from being New Chipping to just Chipping over several hundred years.

Geography

Landscape

Chipping is situated at the foot of three hills, to the north Chipping Hill, to the east Capons Hill and the west Mill Hill. Though historically Chipping was surrounded by dense woodland used for graving pigs and sheep, today only Capons Wood to the east and Burhill Wood to the west of the village survive (never have public right of way). College Wood (formerly adjacent to Capons Wood) was removed in the 1950s/60s, alongside the reduction in the size of Burhill Wood (around 80% of its total area) to make way for increased farmland.

The River Rib runs through the village, with one bridge (Chipping Bridge) across the A10 and two fords along public footpaths crossing the river. 
The village of Buckland lies one mile north of Chipping, whilst the prime meridian passes to the east of Chipping.

Wildlife
The land surrounding Chipping is dominated by farmland growing Winter wheat, Rapeseed, Borage and Broad beans. Such a habitat has meant farmland birds such as the grey partridge, lapwing, skylark, yellowhammer and corn bunting can be found along the many bridleways and public footpaths surrounding Chipping, even though these birds are declining nationally.

See also
Toponymy of England
List of generic forms in British place names

References

External links

https://www.visionofbritain.org.uk/place/26471
http://www.bucklandandchippingpc.org.uk/
https://www.sausagetosser.com/
https://historicengland.org.uk/images-books/photos/item/IOE01/08803/16
http://www.hertfordshire-genealogy.co.uk/data/places/places-b/buckland/buckland.htm

Hamlets in Hertfordshire
East Hertfordshire District